Ernst Bantle (16 February 1901 – 13 April 1978) was a German international footballer.

References

1901 births
1978 deaths
German footballers
Association football forwards
Germany international footballers
Freiburger FC players